Daphne Touw (born 13 January 1970 in Teteringen, North Brabant) is a former field hockey goalkeeper from the Netherlands, who played 68 international matches for the Dutch National Women's Team. She made her debut on 3 July 1993 against Germany, and was a member of the team that won the bronze medal at the 2000 Summer Olympics in Sydney, Australia.

External links

External links 
 
 
 

1970 births
Living people
Dutch female field hockey players
Female field hockey goalkeepers
Field hockey players at the 2000 Summer Olympics
Olympic bronze medalists for the Netherlands
Olympic field hockey players of the Netherlands
Olympic medalists in field hockey
Medalists at the 2000 Summer Olympics
Sportspeople from Breda
20th-century Dutch women
21st-century Dutch women